

Events
January 7 – Neha Kakkar becomes the first Indian singer to win a YouTube Diamond Award.
January 10 – Pakistani singer-songwriter Jawad Ahmad releases a protest song, ""Kisana", on social media, drawing attention to a farmers' protest movement in India and Pakistan.
March 18 – Mumbai-based composer Joseph Conrad Mendoza is accused of borrowing the music and lyrics for his song "We Can Achieve" from "Count on me, Singapore", a national song composed by Hugh Harrison in 1986. Singapore's Ministry of Culture, holders of the copyright on the song, dispute Mendoza's claim that he wrote the song in the early 1980s and lost the original tapes in a flood.
May 2 – The BBC selects Chinese-born percussionist Fang Zhang as the BBC Young Musician of 2020.
June – Iwan Fals wins the Lifetime Achievement Award at the 2021 Telkomsel Awards. Other award winners include Tulus, Raisa and Noah.
October 22 – Yes, I Am A Student is released, marking Punjabi singer Sidhu Moose Wala's debut as a film actor.

Albums
Band-Maid – Unseen World (January 20)
Chaya Czernowin – Heart Chamber
Chai – Wink
Kyuso Nekokami – Mormot Lab
Lil Mariko – Lil Mariko 
Morissette – Signature (EP) (August 20)

Classical
 Toshio Hosokawa – Violin Concerto (Genesis)

Opera

Film, TV and video game scores
Yuki Kajiura – Sword Art Online Progressive: Aria of a Starless Night
Alam Khan – Swapner Thikana
Devi Sri Prasad – Cirkus 
Akira Yamaoka – The Medium (video game)

Musical films
Laal Singh Chaddha (India - Hindi), with music by Pritam
Revue Starlight: The Movie (Japan)
Sing a Bit of Harmony (Japan), with music by Ryō Takahashi
Tangra Blues (India - Bengali), starring Parambrata Chatterjee, with music by Nabarun Bose

Deaths
January 4 
Lee Heung-kam, 88, Cantonese opera star
Elias Rahbani, 82, Lebanese lyricist and composer (COVID-19) 
Chacha Sherly, 29, Indonesian singer (traffic collision)
January 5 – Vennelakanti, 63, Indian lyricist (heart attack)
January 15 – Lệ Thu, 77, Vietnamese singer
January 17 – Ghulam Mustafa Khan, 89, Indian classical singer
January 22 – Narendra Chanchal, 80, Indian singer
January 27 – Trung Kiên, 81, Vietnamese classical singer.
February 4 – Ma Zenghui, 85, Chinese single-string performer
February 15 – Golnoush Khaleghi, 80, Iranian music researcher, composer, and arranger.
February 17 – Ali Hossain, 80, Bangladeshi composer
February 18 – Isaac Thomas Kottukapally, about 73, Indian film score composer
March 17 – Mayada Basilis, 54, Syrian singer (cancer)
March 21 – Trisutji Kamal, 84, Indonesian composer
March 29 – Keiko Toyama, 87, Japanese pianist 
March 30 – Diljaan, 31, Indian singer (traffic accident)
April 2 – Shaukat Ali, 76, Pakistani folk singer
April 11 – Mita Haque, 58, Bangladeshi Rabindra Sangeet singer (COVID-19)
May 1 – Debu Chaudhuri, 85, sitarist (complications from COVID-19)
May 4 
Genji Kuniyoshi, 90, Japanese singer, person of Cultural Merit
Sarena Li, 31, Hong Kong singer (adenoid cystic carcinoma)
May 6 
Comagan, 48, Indian singer, composer and actor (COVID-19)
Prateek Chaudhuri, 49, Indian sitarist (COVID-19)
Prem Dhoj Pradhan, 82, Nepalese musician, singer and composer
May 7
G. Anand, 67, Indian playback singer (COVID-19)
Vanraj Bhatia, 93, Indian film composer
May 10 – Abdolvahab Shahidi, 98, Iranian barbat player, singer and composer
May 12 – Maran, 48, Indian actor and singer (COVID-19)
May 22 – Raamlaxman, 78, Indian composer
June 5 – S. B. John, 86/87, Pakistani ghazal singer
June 8 – Farhad Humayun, 42, Pakistani singer and drummer (Overload).
June 18 – Takeshi Terauchi, 82, Japanese rock guitarist
July 10 – Murali Sithara, 65, Indian composer and music director
July 23 – Fakir Alamgir, 71, Bangladeshi folk and pop singer
August 2 – Kalyani Menon, 80, Indian playback singer
August 6 – Wang Wenjuan, 94, Chinese opera performer
August 15 – Jagjit Kaur, 93, Indian Hindi/Urdu playback singer
August 25 – Subhankar Banerjee, 55, Indian tabla player
August 26 – JB Tuhure, 78, Nepali protest singer and politician
September 7 – Tanwa Rasitanoo, 50, Thai Luk thung and Phleng phuea chiwit singer
September 8 – Pulamaipithan, 85, Indian Tamil lyricist
September 27 – Chris Ho, Singaporean singer (Zircon Lounge), musician and radio DJ, age unknown (stomach cancer)
October 15 – Pornsak Songsaeng, 60, Thai luk thung and mor lam singer (heart attack)
October 17 – Bruce Gaston, 74, American-born Thai classical musician
October 22 – Janali Akbarov, 81, Azerbaijani khananda/mugham folk singer
November 2 – Sabah Fakhri, 88, Syrian tenor
November 12 – Lakshman Wijesekara, 73, Sri Lankan actor, singer and composer (Miss Jenis).
November 21 – Gurmeet Bawa, 77, Indian Punjabi folk singer
November 22 – Asya Sultanova, 98, Azerbaijani composer
November 26 – Bichu Thirumala, 80, Indian Malayalam lyricist
November 30 – Sirivennela Seetharama Sastry, 66, Indian Telugu lyricist
December 4 – Thoppil Anto, 81, Indian playback singer and composer
December 16 – Bogalay Tint Aung, 99, Burmese composer and writer

By country 
 2021 in Chinese music
 2021 in Japanese music
 2021 in Philippine music
 2021 in South Korean music

See also 
 2021 in music

References 

Asia
Asian music
2021 in Asia